Sugar Cane Alley (French title: La Rue Cases-Nègres) is a 1983 film directed by Euzhan Palcy. It is set in Martinique in the 1930s, when black people working sugarcane fields were still treated harshly by their white employers. It is based on a semi-autobiographical novel by Joseph Zobel of the same title (alternatively translated as Black Shack Alley; literally "Street of the Houses of Negroes").

Synopsis
José, the protagonist, is a young boy living in a rural part of Martinique in the 1930s. Many of the people around him, including his grandmother, Ma'Tine, with whom he lives, work in the sugar cane fields where they are browbeaten and badly paid by the white boss. Ma'Tine is chronically ill, suffering several heart episodes, but continues to recover from them and continue her work to support José.

José, an orphan, has a father figure in an elderly man named Medouze who likes to tell him stories about Africa. José attends school at the insistence of his grandmother, who does not want him to end up working in the fields, the probable fate of most of his class. Medouze goes missing, and José finds him dead in a cane field. In order to earn his own lunch, José gets tricked into doing housework for a woman who lives near school, leading to him being repeatedly late for class and getting in trouble.  Despite this, José excels at his French lessons and in his writing.

At school, José befriends a mulatto boy named Léopold but Léopold's white father does not want him to associate with the black field workers. When he drives by and sees José and Léopold playing, he orders Léopold to get in the car but, in trying to retrieve the horse that Léopold was riding, gets kicked in the stomach by it, leading to great injury. On his deathbed, his father refuses to acknowledge formally Léopold as his son, believing that a mulatto should not carry the family name. Léopold, devastated by his father's rejection, runs away from home and goes missing.

José gets high test scores and earns a partial scholarship to attend high school in Fort-de-France, the capital.  Another student, a girl, also wins a place at the school, but her father has already promised her to other people and does not allow her to go.  José gives her his pocket watch to express his condolence to her. His grandmother accompanies him to the capital, working as a laundrywoman for the rich white households to pay the remainder of the fees and their living costs. They are able to find a small trailer to use as a home thanks to José's friend Carmen who drives the boat between the rural area and Fort-de-France.

José deals with pressure around him, especially from one of his teachers. When he writes an essay on the lives of poor blacks he is accused of plagiarism, so he runs away from school, back to his small shack in the city.  The professor goes to his house and tells José that he was wrongly accused, offering an apology and a full scholarship to the school and stipend monies.  José makes enough stipend to relieve Ma'Tine from her laundress job.

Later José returns to Black Shack Alley after his grandmother has a heart attack while returning home from a trip to a local clothesmaker to make José a fresh suit. José sees Léopold being arrested for stealing the boss' ledger to prove that he was cheating the workers out of their earnings. As his grandmother dies, José is launched into a future he cannot control, but will continue to write about his home and the suffering of his brethren.

Awards
The film won the Best First Work award at the 1984 César Awards (the equivalent of the Academy Award in France), and won four awards at the 40th Venice Film Festival, including the Silver Lion.
The actress, Darling Légitimus, 76 years old at this period, won the Prize of Best Actress (Gold Lion). The film won also the Venice Film Festival Unicef Award and the International Catholic Organization for Cinema and Audiovisual (OCIC) award.
In America, it won the First Prize Critics Award at the Worldfest-Houston International Film Festival.  In Africa it won the first Public Award at the Fespaco.

References

External links

1983 films
French drama films
1983 drama films
1980s French-language films
Films set in the 1930s
Films shot in Martinique
Films set in Martinique
Best First Feature Film César Award winners
1983 directorial debut films
Films directed by Euzhan Palcy
1980s French films